Dar El Bahdja (Arabic: دار البهجة) is an Algerian TV series broadcast during the month of Ramadan 2013. It is produced by SD-BOX, directed by Djaffar Gacem, dialogued by Mohamed Charchal.

The series tells the diaries of a popular neighborhood dwellers, problems and events among them in a comedic framework.
It premiere on 2013 on Télévision Algérienne, A3 and Canal Algérie.

Cast  
 Biyouna as Khalti Djouhar
 Othmane Ben Daouad as Sliman
 Farida Sabounji as Khdaouaj
 Nawal Zmit as Turkiya
 Ahmed Amine Dellal as Zino
 Souhila Mallem as Zina
 Chems Eddine Lamrani as Reda
 Blaha Ben Ziane

References 

Algerian television series
Arabic television series
2013 Algerian television series debuts
2010s Algerian television series
Public Establishment of Television original programming